Alexis Bachelay (born 19 August 1973) is a French politician.

Bachelay was born in Saint-Maur-des-Fossés on 19 August 1973. He was elected to the National Assembly in 2012, and represented Hauts-de-Seine's 1st constituency on behalf of the Socialist Party. On 3 July 2020, when Patrick Chaimovitch took office as mayor of Colombes, Bachelay was elected a deputy mayor alongside Fatoumata Sow, by a vote of the municipal council.

References

1973 births
Living people
Deputies of the 14th National Assembly of the French Fifth Republic
Deputy mayors
Politicians from Île-de-France
Socialist Party (France) politicians
People from Saint-Maur-des-Fossés
People from Colombes
Pantheon-Sorbonne University alumni